John Roe (6 October 1959 – 9 March 2018) was a British mathematician.

Roe grew up in the countryside in Shropshire. He went to Rugby School, was an undergraduate at Cambridge University, and received his D.Phil. in 1985 from the University of Oxford under the supervision of Michael Atiyah. As a post-doctoral student, he was at the Mathematical Sciences Research Institute (MSRI) in Berkeley, and then a tutor at Jesus College, Oxford. From 1998 until shortly before his death he was a professor at the Pennsylvania State University.

His research interests center around index theorems, coarse geometry, operator algebras, noncommutative geometry, and the Novikov conjecture in differential topology.  He was an editor of the Journal of Noncommutative Geometry and the Journal of Topology.

In 1996 he was awarded the Whitehead Prize. In 2012 he became a fellow of the American Mathematical Society.

Books
Elementary Geometry
Lectures on Coarse Geometry
Winding Around, American Math Society, (2015)
Analytic K-Homology with Nigel Higson
Mathematics for Sustainability, Springer, (2018)

References

External links
Home page

1959 births
2018 deaths
20th-century British mathematicians
21st-century British mathematicians
Scientists from Shropshire
Alumni of the University of Cambridge
Alumni of the University of Oxford
Pennsylvania State University faculty
Academic journal editors
Fellows of the American Mathematical Society
British geometers
Topologists